Signé Arsène Lupin (also known as Signed, Arsene Lupin) is a 1959 French-Italian crime film written and directed by Yves Robert. It is the sequel of The Adventures of Arsène Lupin (1957).

Plot  
Arsène Lupin and his accomplice La Ballu rob a villa. Being disturbed by the police, they have time to take a picture. This painting represents a fresco in three parts, La Ballu steals the second painting. The third painting is in the Florence Museum but when Lupin arrives, the painting is gone.

Cast 
 Robert Lamoureux: André Laroche / Arsène Lupin
 Alida Valli: Aurelia Valeano
 Jacques Dufilho: Albert 
 Robert Dalban: Inspector Béchoux
 Michel Etcheverry: Van Nelden
 Jean Galland: General  
 Harold Kay: Henri 
 Paul Müller: Attache at the embassy in Rome
 Ginette Pigeon: Agnès 
 Roger Dumas: Isidore Beautrelet aka Véritas
 Yves Robert: La Ballu
 Gabriel Gobin: Employee of the SNCF
 Paul Préboist: Drunk man  
 Robert Rollis: Traveler on the train

References

External links
 

1959 films
1959 crime films
French crime films
Italian crime films
Films directed by Yves Robert
Arsène Lupin films
French sequel films
Films with screenplays by Jean-Paul Rappeneau
Films set in 1919
1950s French films
1950s Italian films